Gagea alberti is an Asian species of plants in the lily family, native to Kazakhstan, Kyrgyzstan and Xinjiang Province of western China.

Gagea alberti is a bulb-forming perennial up to 15 cm tall. Flowers are pale yellow to yellow-green.

References

External links
Tropicos, Flora of China Illustrations vol. 24, figure 104, drawings 6-10 at right

alberti
Flora of Asia
Plants described in 1880